Il giro del mondo degli innamorati di Peynet , internationally released as Around the World with Peynet's Lovers and The Turn of the World of the Sweethearts of Peynet, is a 1974 Italian animation film directed by Cesare Perfetto.

The film is based on the characters created by the French illustrator Raymond Peynet.

References

External links

1974 films
Italian animated films
1974 animated films
1970s Italian-language films
Films scored by Ennio Morricone
Animated films based on comics
1970s Italian films